Iqra Aziz Hussain (born 24 November 1997) is a Pakistani actress who primarily works in Urdu television. She made her acting debut in 2014 with a supporting role shanzey in Kissey Apna Kahein. Aziz is widely recognized for portraying the role of Ajiya in Momina Duraid's comedy Suno Chanda (2018), for which she received critical acclaim and won several awards including Lux Style Awards and Hum Awards for Best Actress.

Aziz first auditioned as a television commercial model and was picked by Citrus Talent Agency. She had her first lead role with the 2015 romantic drama series Muqaddas. Subsequently, she is known for her main portrayals in shows like Choti Si Zindagi (2016), Qurban (2018), Suno Chanda (2018), Tabeer (2018), Ranjha Ranjha Kardi (2018) and Jhooti (2020). Aziz was last seen in Geo TV's romantic series Khuda Aur Muhabbat 3 portraying Mahi Shah opposite Feroze Khan (2021).

Early life 
Aziz was born on 24 November 1997 in Karachi. She mentioned in interviews about her mother's struggles being a single parent. Iqra finished college while working but eventually left her studies to focus on acting. In 2018, she talked about her plans to resume education in the next couple of years.

Career 
Aziz started her career when she was 14. She dabbled into acting with the help of her elder sister. She first auditioned as a television commercial model and was picked by Talent agency Citrus. Aziz continues to appear in television commercials till date. Later she was noticed by Hum TV's co producer Momina Duraid who offered her a role in her series Kissey Apna Kahein. She acted along with Arij Fatyma, Danish Taimoor, Shabbir Jan and other senior actors in the series.

She followed her acting career with a leading role in another Hum TV's drama series Muqaddas, an adaptation of Adeel Razzak's novel of the same name. The series proved to be the break-through for her and she received Hum Award for Best Television Sensation female. The series also received mix reviews and was nominated for Best Television Play at annual Lux Style Awards. In the same year she appeared as a parallel lead in Ilyas Kashmiri's directorial Mol.

In 2016 she was seen in a leading role in Socha Na Tha and Deewana. In the later, she played the character of Mehar Sultana (Mehru) who befriends the mischievous but loving Jinn Falak (Shehroz Sabzwari) and eventually falls in love with him.  Aziz subsequently did a supporting role of Marina Zaman in Ahmed Bhatti's directorial Kisay Chahoon and a parallel lead role of Mannat Chaudhary in Laaj. Her on-screen chemistry with Shehzad Sheikh in Choti Si Zindagi was praised and both received a nomination for Best Onscreen Couple. The series also garnered her a nomination for Best Actress at Hum Awards.

Aziz then starred in Gustakh Ishq opposite Zahid Ahmed and did a guest appearance in 2017 series Dil-e-Jaanam. She appeared in Ghairat (series based on Honour Killing) along with Syed Jibran and Muneeb Butt and in romantic drama Khamoshi opposite Zara Noor Abbas, Affan Waheed and Bilal Khan. The later of which was a critically and commercial hit. In Khamoshi, Aziz played the character of Naeema, an arrogant, greedy and career-driven girl. Her role as antagonist was praised. A reviewer from Mangobaaz wrote, "The way she has portrayed Naeema’s character so well that you can’t help but hate her". Aziz walked the ramp for designer Aisha Farid's collection Crystalline on Hum TV's Bridal Couture Week. In early January 2018, she wrapped up the shooting of an Urdu music video "O Jaana" with Hamza Malik and Rahat Fateh Ali Khan which was released in July 2018. and did a special appearance in Asim Azhar's music video "Jo Tu Na Mila".

The following year, Aziz collaborated with Shehzad Sheikh for the second time, (alongside Bilal Abbas Khan and Omair Rana) in Idream Entertainment's Qurban. She appeared as Heer, a bubbly and bright girl hailing from a rich household and was seen in a love triangle opposite Sheikh and Khan. She portrayed the role of Ajiya Nazakat (Jiya) in Suno Chanda which was a finite series during Ramadan 2018. She was paired opposite Farhan Saeed. Aziz and Saeed were praised for their on-screen chemistry. The series received mix reviews and earned her a nomination for Best Television Actress at Lux Style Awards. In an interview, Aziz said that she was overwhelmed and was not expect the series to be the massive hit. She played the role of Tabeer in Hum TV's Tabeer. Ahmed Sarym of The Express Tribune states, "At such a young age, Aziz has already proven her mettle through a wide range of characters from the exuberant Jiya to a vampish Naeema in Khamoshi and the titular character of Tabeer".

She then appeared in Faiza Iftikhar's Ranjha Ranjha Kardi. Her role as Noori belongs to the lower cast of Untouchables was praised by critics. Buraq Shabbir of The News International stated, "Popularly known as the feisty Jia from Suno Chanda and now the equally fiery Noori in Ranjha Ranjha Kardi, has spark". Her other projects included the second season of Suno Chanda which is an Ahson Talish directorial and produced by MD Productions. It aired in 2019 on Hum TV.

Other work and media image 

Iqra has also appeared as a guest in serials and talkshows. Her first guest appearance was in Jago Pakistan Jago in 2015. In 2018 she appeared as a Guest in The After Moon Show a comedy-talkshow and Tonite with HSY. In May 2018, Aziz became a victim of news after breaching contract with the Citrus talent. Fahad Hussain, Head of Citrus Talent states, Aziz breached an agreement that states the latter has to solely work in projects approved by the talent agency. She has, however signed contract and deal with another PR agency, despite being reminded of the first contract. In response Aziz denies the allegations saying, "Fahad never provided her with a copy of the agreement that she breached and used to delay her rightful payments for many months". Later the dispute was solved by their lawyers on which both said, 

In September 2018, she won the Most Stylish TV actor Award at the Hum TV Style Awards. She also performed on Hum Style Awards along with Farhan Saeed. She serves as an ambassador for a number of brands such as 7up, Nestle, Cadbury, and National Foods. In November 2018 she paired with model Hasnain Lehri to launch OPPO's A7 in Pakistan. She was also the brand ambassador for the same. She was named in the Top 50 Sexiest Asian Women List by Eastern Eye and most searched people of Google Pakistan in 2018. After the success of Ranjha Ranjha Kardi and Suno Chanda, she was cited by The News International as playing an inspirational female character on Pakistani television. In July 2019, controversy arose after few pictures of Iqra's vacation in Thailand circa 2018 wherein she was dressed in beach-styled minimal clothing. The photos garnered negative reaction on social media and her sister, Sidra Aziz, took to Twitter to express her discomfort over the negative comments.

Personal life 
On 7 July 2019, at the 18th Lux Style Awards, Aziz became engaged to Yasir Hussain publicly. On 28 December 2019, she married Yasir Hussain. In July 2021, Aziz gave birth to their son.

Television

Other appearance

Music videos

Awards and nominations

References

External links 

 
 

Living people
21st-century Pakistani actresses
Pakistani television actresses
1997 births
Actresses in Urdu cinema